Omoglymmius emdomani is a species of beetle in the subfamily Rhysodidae. It was described by R.T. & J.R. Bell in 2000.

References

emdomani
Beetles described in 2000